Brigit Pegeen Kelly (1951 – October 14, 2016) was an American poet and teacher. Born in Palo Alto, California, Kelly grew up in southern Indiana and lived much of her adult life in central Illinois. An intensely private woman, little is known about her life.

Career
Kelly was the winner of numerous awards for her poetry, including the Yale Younger Poets award, a Whiting award, and, in 1997, was named the Lamont Poet at the Phillips Exeter Academy.

Kelly was a professor of Creative Writing at the University of Illinois at Urbana-Champaign and served as senior poetry editor of Ninth Letter. She also taught, during different periods, at the University of California at Irvine, Purdue University, and Warren Wilson College.

Awards
2008: Fellowship of the Academy of American Poets
2006: Fellowship from the John Simon Guggenheim Memorial Foundation
2005: Pulitzer Prize (poetry), Finalist (for The Orchard)
2005: National Book Critics' Circle (poetry), Finalist
2005: Los Angeles Times Book Award (poetry), Finalist
2005: National Endowment for the Arts Fellowship
1999: American Academy of Arts and Letters Witter Bynner Poetry Prize
1996: Whiting Award
1995: Los Angeles Times Book Prize in Poetry, Finalist
1994: Lamont Poetry Prize (for Song)
1986: Yale Younger Poets Award, selected by James Merrill
1986: Discovery/The Nation Poetry Prize

Books

Chapbooks

Anthologies

References

External links
Academy of American Poets Biography
Literary Agent site
BOA Editions Biography
Profile at The Whiting Foundation
The Orchard reviewed in Double Room

1951 births
2016 deaths
Purdue University faculty
Warren Wilson College faculty
University of Illinois Urbana-Champaign faculty
University of California, Irvine faculty
American women poets
Yale Younger Poets winners
Writers from Illinois
Poets from Illinois
American women academics
21st-century American women